The Ohsweken Speedway is a 3/8 mile dirt track in the village of Ohsweken, Ontario, Canada. Ohsweken’s weekly Friday night racing program runs from May to September each year, featuring 360 Sprint Cars, Crate Sprint Cars, Thunder Stocks, and Mini Stocks, while the season finishes each year with the annual Canadian Sprint Car Nationals. Ohsweken Speedway also hosts weekly Micro Sprint racing on Thursday nights, and hosted the World of Outlaws Sprint Car Series from 2007 until 2017.

History
In 1994 race car driver Glenn Styres built the 3/8 mile oval Ohsweken Speedway on 80 acres of Styres family-owned land on the
Six Nations of the Grand River First Nation Reserve southeast of Brantford, Ontario.  The track has been continuously expanded in each year of its existence.

The track’s seating capacity was increased to over 8,000 in 2008 and a project was conducted to install Musco lighting, illuminating the speedway to allow the World of Outlaws Sprint Car series to run at the facility.

World of Outlaws - Six Nations Showdown

The prestigious World of Outlaws Sprint Car Series made its first trip to Ohsweken Speedway for the first running of the Six Nations Showdown on July 25, 2007. Jason Sides won the inaugural event. In 2011, NASCAR Sprint Cup Champion Tony Stewart won his first career World of Outlaws race at Ohsweken and repeated the victory in 2012.

Photo gallery

See also
Dirt track racing
List of dirt track ovals in Canada
Sprint car racing
Short track motor racing
Auto racing
Race track

References

External links
 Ohsweken Speedway Official Site
 Google Map view of Ohsweken Speedway
 World of Outlaws Sprint Car Series Official Site

Motorsport venues in Ontario
Dirt oval racing venues in Canada
Motorsport in Canada
1996 establishments in Ontario